Tall Timbers, Maryland may refer to:

Tall Timbers, Anne Arundel County, Maryland, an unincorporated community in Anne Arundel County
Tall Timbers, St. Mary's County, Maryland, an unincorporated community in St. Mary's County